Patrick Nix is an American football coach and former player. He played college football as a quarterback at Auburn University from 1992 to 1995.  Nix served as the head football coach at Henderson State University from 1999 to 2000, compiling a record of 3–19.

Playing career
Nix played high school football at Etowah High School in Attalla, Alabama.  He then attended Auburn University, where he was a standout quarterback for the Auburn Tigers.  He came in for an injured Stan White against Alabama to help lead the Tigers to a perfect 11–0 record during his sophomore season in 1993. Nix graduated in 1995 as the school's career leader in passing efficiency. At Auburn, Nix played under head coach Terry Bowden; offensive coordinator Tommy Bowden, future head coach for Clemson; and quarterbacks coach Jimbo Fisher, current head coach at Texas A&M.  Nix holds the Auburn passing record for the most pass completions in a game with 34 completions against Arkansas.

Coaching career

Georgia Tech
In 2002, Nix joined the coaching staff at Georgia Tech.  Nix was Tech's running backs coach and recruiting coordinator during his first year. In 2003, he served as quarterbacks coach and running game coordinator. In 2004, he was elevated to offensive coordinator while continuing on as quarterbacks coach. For 2005, Nix's offense boasted both the ACC's leading rusher (Tashard Choice) and its leading receiver (Calvin Johnson). Prior to the 2006 season, Nix assumed full play-calling duties. Tech would go on to make appearances in the ACC Championship Game and the Gator Bowl.

Miami
In January 2007, Nix was hired by Miami to serve as offensive coordinator under head coach Randy Shannon.

Charleston Southern
In July 2010, Nix was hired as the wide receivers coach for Charleston Southern.  Charleston Southern officially announced this July 28, 2010.

Personal life
Nix is the son of Conrad Nix and Patsy Nix.  Conrad is a retired coach with 300 wins and two consecutive state championships. He retired in 2009 from Northside High School in Warner Robins, Georgia.  Nix is married to the former Krista Chapman, and the couple has four children. Nix's son, Bo Nix, was named starting quarterback for Nix's alma mater, the Auburn Tigers, on August 20, 2019.

Head coaching record

College

References

Living people
1972 births
American football quarterbacks
Auburn Tigers football players
Charleston Southern Buccaneers football coaches
Georgia Tech Yellow Jackets football coaches
Henderson State Reddies football coaches
Jacksonville State Gamecocks football coaches
Miami Hurricanes football coaches
Samford Bulldogs football coaches
High school football coaches in Alabama
People from Etowah County, Alabama
Players of American football from Alabama